The Berkeley Macintosh Users Group, or more commonly "BMUG", was the largest Macintosh User Group. It was founded in September 1984 by a group of UC Berkeley students including Reese Jones and Raines Cohen as a focal-point for the nascent Apple Macintosh user community. With more than 13,000 members, or "BMUGgers" at its peak in 1993, the group was the largest, and generally understood to be the most important, Macintosh users group. A few of the notable members include John "Captain Crunch" Draper, the Sultan of Brunei Hassanal Bolkiah, notorious murderer Enrique Zambrano, early hacker-chaser Cliff Stoll, Inktomi founder Eric Brewer, and may prominent computing journalists like John Dvorak, Ilene Hoffman, Leo Laporte and Adam Engst. An example of the group's omnipresent blue-floppy-disk lapel pin is held in the Smithsonian Institution's American History collection. BMUG's history and activities were closely linked with the MacWorld Expo meetings, traditionally held in San Francisco each January and Boston each August.

Organization 
Day-to-day management of the organization was balanced between the senior full-time staff: business manager Harry Critchfield, technical manager Steve Costa, and support manager Randy Simon.

Business 

BMUG's finances and business operations were managed by Harry Critchfield and Alisa Schulman, better known for her role as a DJ at KALX. In 1995 Anne Wrixon replaced Harry Critchfield, and in 1997, Wrixon was replaced by Hal Gibson, who remained until the end.

Technical 

One of BMUG's principal operations was collaborative Macintosh repair and maintenance. A benefit of BMUG membership was hardware repair (and often recovery of lost documents from floppy and hard disks). The technical operations were managed by Steve Costa. Electrical engineer Chuck Meyer conducted many of the trickier repairs. Herb Dang was a fixture in BMUG's technical services, and his son Frank continued that tradition into a second generation.

Support 

BMUG maintained a Macintosh support call-center, which helped users around the world by answering questions and helping them resolve technical problems with their computers. The support operation was managed by Randy Simon, and staffed by volunteers. While much of the support operation dealt with assisting users whose computers had crashed, a significant portion of it dealt with the specific "vertical market" of desktop publishing and prepress issues, which was then in its infancy and was one of the Macintosh's primary markets. Randy Simon also coordinated the production and publications of BMUG's massive biannual newsletters, sometimes totaling more than a thousand pages per year, initially with the assistance of BMUG volunteers Carolyn Sagami, Zig Zichterman, Robert Lettieri and Bill Woodcock, and later Hans Hansen. A collaboration between BMUG members, Programming SIG chair Greg Dow (now at Adobe) and networking and prepress expert Bill Woodcock (now at Packet Clearing House) resulted in the first example of "database publishing," a 1989 encyclopedia of Macintosh software, for which plates were produced directly from a FileMaker database without intervening processing.

Offices 

BMUG was initially located in suite 3B, 2150 Kittredge Street, in downtown Berkeley, directly adjoining the southwest corner of the UC Berkeley campus. This building also housed Farallon Computing until Farallon outgrew the space and moved five blocks south-east to Dwight Way. After six years, BMUG moved to a larger space with street frontage at 2055 Center Street, a block and a half west of campus and directly across from the downtown Berkeley BART station.

Projects

Shareware disk duplication 

BMUG's primary revenue-generating activity was the sneakernet distribution of Macintosh shareware software from its comprehensive library on 400k and 800k 3.5" floppy disks. BMUG's shareware disk duplication and distribution program was run by Art Lau and Gerald Raddatz, supplemented by the efforts of many of the other volunteers.

BMUGnet/PhoneNET 

One of the early successes for the group was BMUGNet, a variant of Apple's LocalTalk system which used standard telephone wires to connect Macintosh computers together in a local area network. Wiring plans were initially published in the Fall 1985 BMUG Newsletter, but members could purchase adapters assembled by the group. Co-founder Reese Jones branched the production off as the commercial business Farallon Computing in 1986, renaming the product PhoneNet. The group invented other subsequent low-cost hardware kits as well... the 1991 introduction of the low-cost Mac LC prompted BMUG to begin offering a $12 VGA monitor adapter. MacRecorder, the first audio input device for the Macintosh, was also first released in 1985 as a BMUG kit, before being productized by Farallon and then Macromedia.

Weekly meetings 
BMUG was famous for lively meetings, "We are in the business of giving away information" motto, "BMUG Awards", its great MacWorld Expo get-togethers, CD and book publishing, 400+ page biannual "newsletters" akin to the Whole Earth Catalog, and one of the largest shareware collections for Macintosh Public domain software sold to members and customers on floppy disks. These meetings are often cited by tech notables as their introduction to technology.

BMUG hosted an enthusiastic weekly Thursday night meeting with questions and answers, and software demonstrations by vendors, followed at the end by a raffle. Notable speakers included: Steve Jobs, Guy Kawasaki, Ted Nelson, Heidi Roizen, Andy Hertzfeld, Bill Atkinson, Jean-Louis Gassée, Marc Benioff, Melinda Ann French (Gates) and Bill Gates.

Special Interest Groups 

It also held Special Interest Groups (SIGs) on Basic Mac, Troubleshooting, ClarisWorks (integrated word processing, drawing, painting, spreadsheet, database and telecommunications), FileMakerPro relational databases, graphics, video, music, the Internet, programming and mathematics. Branch groups held general meetings in outlying areas, including San Francisco, Cupertino and Tokyo.

Biannual Newsletter 
The newsletter was originally edited by volunteers Carolyn Sagami and Zig Zichterman, until Randy Simon was hired as staff, and given the responsibility. The newsletter was published punctually twice each year, and each issue routinely exceeded 300 pages in length.

Bulletin Board System 

BMUG's Bulletin board system or "BBS" was managed by Bernard Aboba (then in graduate school at Stanford and UC Berkeley, subsequently at Microsoft) with the assistance of Bill Woodcock. It was an early FidoNet node, and from 1986 through 1993, the home of the FidoNet MacNetAdmin "echo," which spawned the AppleTalk Network Managers Association (which in turn begat the AppleTalk Networking Forum), the inaptly-named A/UX Users Group, and numerous other real-world periodic meet-ups. The BMUG BBS also served as a nexus for the interoperability testing of email gateways between FidoNet, UUCP, SMTP, and a number of proprietary AppleTalk, NetWare, and Internet Protocol electronic mail systems, including CE Software's QuickMail, SoftArc's FirstClass, those from Information Electronics and AppleLink Personal Edition, which went on to become America Online. When the BBS host system in Berkeley was damaged by the 1989 Loma Prieta earthquake, Aboba set up a temporary stand-in using a solid-state industrial PLC and multi-line serial controller, which was able to keep up with the heavy call volume by answering, presenting an ASCII banner explaining the situation, and immediately disconnecting. Aboba also authored The BMUG Guide to Bulletin Boards and Beyond. The BBS eventually ran on hardware in Berkeley, Palo Alto, Boston, and Tokyo.

Controversy

Rivalry with the Boston Computer Society 
BMUG was certainly the largest Macintosh users group, but the Boston Computer Society was the largest computer users group. BCS-Mac, the Macintosh special interest group of the Boston Computer Society, was the second largest Macintosh users group. A good-humored rivalry obtained between the two groups throughout their mutual existence, but they were ultimately supportive of each other. BMUG's first foray onto BCS-Mac's Boston home turf, at MacWorld Expo on August 11–13 of 1987 was commemorated with a new T-shirt, featuring an inscription "BMUG in Boston" which Bill Woodcock, who designed BMUG's T-shirts, intended to look like graffiti, using a rattle-can to write the original text in black paint on white paper, which was then photographed, scanned, and converted to PostScript in Adobe illustrator, before being silkscreened in red on black shirts. The red-on-black effect, however, was said by startled BCS-Mac members to more resemble dripping blood than spray-paint.

1995-1997 Budget Crisis 
By 1995, BMUG had accumulated a debt of $250,000, which forced a two-year period of restructuring and the layoff of some of the staff, but which was weathered successfully.

Conclusion 

While BMUG the not-for-profit corporation declared bankruptcy in 2000, its members continue to collaborate and meet. Branch groups of the organisation have continued on their own:

 the San Francisco branch continues as BMUGWest
 the South Bay group continues as Silicon Valley MUG
 the Mac refurbishing project was reformed into Access2Technology, which has since shuttered.
 Members purchased the group's online presence (the BMUG BBS) and have kept it running as PlanetMUG, in conjunction with The BostonBBS (formerly the Boston Computer Society's Mac BBS).

See also 
 :Category:Berkeley Macintosh Users Group members

References

External links 
 PlanetMUG, the global online community that's grown out of the BMUG BBS
 Silicon Valley Macintosh Users Group, the south-bay outgrowth of BMUG, which continues to this day
 Bellarine Mac User Group, unrelated but with the same acronym and purpose, currently operating in Geelong, Australia
 LaserWriter II: A Novel, documenting the contemporaneous and similar community around Tekserve, a similar Macintosh User Group in New York

Apple Inc. user groups
Culture of Berkeley, California
1984 establishments in California
2000 disestablishments in California